Xun County or Xunxian is a county in the north of Henan province, China. It is under the administration of the prefecture-level city of Hebi and located on the transition of the East China Plain and the  Taihang Mountains.

Xun County has a historic center originating to 1331, one of the best preserved of the East China Plain, and is located along the Grand Canal.

The landscape is characterized by the hills of Dayao and Fuqiu rising from the plains.

The Yellow River historically had its course through the south of the county, causing numerous floods.

History 
During the Shang dynasty the area was called Li. During the Western Han Dynasty it was first established as a county. In 1115 it was named Xunzhou, governing over Liyang County and Wei County. It was demoted to a county named Xun County in 1369.

Administrative divisions
As 2012, this county is divided to 7 towns and 2 townships.
Towns

Townships
Baisi Township
Wangzhuang Township

Climate

Notable people 
Duanmu Ci was born in Xun County.

Transport 
Huaxun railway station

References

County-level divisions of Henan
Hebi